Each team's roster for the 2012 IIHF World Championship consists of at least 15 skaters (forwards, and defencemen) and 2 goaltenders, and at most 22 skaters and 3 goaltenders. All sixteen participating nations, through the confirmation of their respective national associations, had to submit a roster by the first IIHF directorate meeting.


Legend

Belarus
Head coach:

Skaters

Goaltenders

Canada
Head coach:

Skaters

Goaltenders

Czech Republic
Head coach:

Skaters

Goaltenders

Denmark
Head coach:

Skaters

Goaltenders

Finland
Head coach:

Skaters

Goaltenders

France
Head coach:

Skaters

Goaltenders

Germany
Head coach:

Skaters

Goaltenders

Italy
Head coach:

Skaters

Goaltenders

Kazakhstan
Head coach:

Skaters

Goaltenders

Latvia
Head coach:

Skaters

Goaltenders

Norway
Head coach:

Skaters

Goaltenders

Russia
Head coach:

Skaters

Goaltenders

Slovakia
Head coach:

Skaters

Goaltenders

Sweden
Head coach:

Skaters

Goaltenders

Switzerland
Head coach:

Skaters

Goaltenders

United States
Head coach:

Skaters

Goaltenders

References

Team rosters

Belarus
Canada
Czech Republic
Denmark
Finland
France
Germany
Italy

Kazakhstan
Latvia
Norway
Russia
Slovakia
Sweden
Switzerland
United States

Team statistics

Belarus
Canada
Czech Republic
Denmark
Finland
France
Germany
Italy

Kazakhstan
Latvia
Norway
Russia
Slovakia
Sweden
Switzerland
United States

rosters
IIHF World Championship rosters